Edward Römer may refer to:
 Edward Jan Römer, Polish writer, translator, social activist and painter
 Edward Mateusz Römer, his son, Baltic-German/Polish painter